"Tomorrowland" is the thirteenth and final episode of the fourth season of the American television drama series Mad Men, and the 52nd overall episode of the series. It aired on the AMC channel in the United States on October 17, 2010. It was written by Jonathan Igla and Matthew Weiner and directed by Matthew Weiner.

Don takes a vacation to California with the children and his secretary, Megan Calvet, where he visits the home of his old friend Anna Draper and Disneyland. Megan (who confesses she has 10 nieces and nephews) gets along well with children, and she and Don continue their affair. During the trip, Don makes a quick decision and proposes to Megan, giving her the engagement ring Anna Draper had bequeathed him.  They announce their engagement to SCDP's partners and Faye Miller, to mixed reactions.

Betty has a meltdown after finding Glen Bishop in the house and subsequently begins making changes in her life and the lives of those around her.

Peggy finalizes a meeting with Topaz Pantyhose. After impressing them with her ideas, she and Ken sign the account, bringing the agency back from the brink of collapse, but their victory is unappreciated in the wake of Don and Megan's engagement.

"Tomorrowland" was the last Mad Men episode to air for 17 months as heated contract negotiations between AMC and Matthew Weiner began after the season. A consequence of this hiatus saw the show switch from airing in the Summer/Fall to the Spring for the remainder of its run.

Plot 
It is October 1965. Faye enters Don's apartment and bedroom early one morning.  Faye tells Don that he needs to tell other people the truth about himself.  Don is apprehensive due to a morning business meeting and a flight to California.  Later that morning, Don Draper and Pete Campbell are meeting with the American Cancer Society to discuss potential ideas for a campaign. The board is receptive and as the meeting breaks up, Don strikes up a conversation with an executive from Dow Chemical.  Later, while debriefing at SCDP, Roger Sterling, Don, and Pete try to convince Ken Cosgrove to invite his future father-in-law to a round of golf with Pete and a senior executive from Dow Chemical, who is on the board at the ACS.  Cosgrove declines and insists that he keeps his work and private lives separate. Later in the morning, Lane Pryce gives Joan a promotion, adding that it is only a title but promising a raise when the firm has more money.

Don has arranged to take his kids with him on a business trip to California and then to Disneyland for a vacation. Meanwhile, Carla permits Glen Bishop to say goodbye to Sally, as Betty and Henry plan to move to the nearby town of Rye. Betty, upon finding Glen in her house, tells Carla to leave and pays her what is due, effectively firing her. Betty then phones Don and informs him that she has fired Carla and does not want her to accompany Don and the kids to California.  Don then asks his secretary Megan to find him a suitable babysitter.  When she fails to find someone on such short notice, Don impulsively asks Megan to accompany them and take care of his children while he attends to business.

Betty's husband, Henry, is furious over both the decision to fire Carla, and Betty's refusal to provide her a letter of recommendation.  He angrily points out that Carla was important to the children's stability, which was Betty's supposed reason for staying in the Ossining house. When Betty tries to justify it by saying she wanted a "fresh start", Henry tells her that she's a child and that "there's no such thing as a fresh start". Later, we see Betty sleeping alone in Sally's bedroom.

In California, Don discovers that Megan is great with his kids, having had experience with her nephews and nieces. Don takes the kids to visit Anna Draper's home. The children see "Dick & Anna '64" painted on the wall from Don's earlier visit.  Sally asks who Dick is, and after hesitating, Don tells her that "Dick" is a nickname he sometimes uses.  Anna's niece, Stephanie (Caity Lotz), gives Don the engagement ring that Anna had received from the real Don Draper. Don returns to the hotel where Megan and his children ask him to go swimming.  He declines, claiming he is very tired.  We then see him sitting alone in his hotel room, deep in anxious thought.  Later, Don relaxes and plays with the children in the swimming pool.

While Don is away, Peggy receives a visit from her friend at Life magazine, who in turn introduces Peggy to a pretty model who had just been fired from a commercial assignment in their building. It is revealed that Topaz Hosiery has fired their ad firm and scrapped all of their ideas. Peggy realizes that Topaz is looking for a new advertising agency. She passes this information to Ken Cosgrove, who is able to secure a meeting during the upcoming holiday weekend.  The executives are receptive to Peggy's ideas during the meeting, and later ask Cosgrove for a presentation in a week's time. When told of this, Peggy is ecstatic as this is the first account that the firm has brought in within ten weeks.

Megan returns from a night out at the Whisky a Go Go with Camille (Kim Poirier), her college roommate. After conversation on the outside deck of the hotel room,  Megan and Don kiss and then spend the night together.  In bed the next morning, Don tells Megan that he wants to know if he can come back to her bed again before returning to New York. During breakfast, Bobby and Sally begin to argue causing Sally to spill her milkshake all over the table. Expecting an angry reaction to the mishap, Don and the children are surprised and pleased when Megan calmly cleans up the milkshake and defuses any lingering tension.  The pleasant response especially surprises Don, who had become accustomed to Betty's childish and selfish demeanor. Later, back at Don's apartment, Megan wakes. Don tells her that he's in love with her and proposes marriage, giving her the engagement ring he received from Anna Draper.  A shocked Megan accepts and then calls her mother.

At the SCDP offices later that day, Don tells the other partners and Joan about the engagement, receiving their congratulations after a moment of shock.  Peggy and Ken, elated over landing the Topaz account, are caught off guard when they learn of Don's engagement.  Peggy remains to speak to Don alone, and registers her shock at Don's news. Don tells her that Megan reminds him a lot of Peggy, and that she has the "same spark." Later, Joan and Peggy discuss how the men's personal news outweighs their own reasons for celebration. Joan later talks by phone to her husband Greg, who is shown on an Army base in Vietnam in uniform, and discusses her pregnancy (revealing that she had not had an abortion earlier in the season).

After stalling for much of the day, Don finally calls Faye to end their relationship and inform her of his sudden engagement. Faye, clearly upset, tells Don that she hopes "[Megan] knows you only like the beginnings of things," before hanging up on him and immediately bursting into tears.

Don arrives at the Ossining house and is surprised to find Betty still there, having arranged to meet a real estate agent.  After retrieving a hidden bottle of liquor, they toast each other and Betty confides in Don that her new home isn't perfect (implying that her new life with Henry isn't everything she thought it would be). Don simply tells her that if it isn't perfect she can move again, then tells her that he is engaged. Betty, momentarily shocked but not surprised, congratulates him. When the doorbell rings, Don walks out to answer the door and Betty walks out in the opposite direction.

The episode ends with Don and Megan in his bed.  Megan is fast asleep, while Don lies awake, staring out of his window into the New York night.

Music 
 The lullaby that Megan teaches Sally and Bobby is "Il était un petit navire".
 The show closes with the song "I Got You Babe" by Sonny and Cher.

Reception

Ratings
"Tomorrowland" attracted 2.44 million viewers and 0.8 million viewers in the coveted adults 18-49 age demographic on the night of its original airing.

Critical reception
The finale was warmly received by television critics. Alan Sepinwall praised the finale and the season, and observed that many of the characters, through their actions (using Don's marriage, Joan's pregnancy, and Betty's firing of Carla and moving out of the Ossining house as examples), were trying to create a fresh start. He predicted that during the fifth season that "many of them are going to find these fresh starts feeling like the stale lives they had before." James Poniewozik of Time Magazine enjoyed the episode but was nonplussed by the small focus on the agency storyline, calling it "a pretty big oversight in ending the season, when the second half of it had largely been devoted to SCDP's existential crisis." Eric Goldman of IGN considered it a good finale, saying, "It's our nature to compare this season finale with last year's game-changing, super exciting one, and I'm guessing most will feel it comes up short. But really, 'Shut the Door. Have a Seat' was so unique among Mad Men episodes, and it would have felt artificial to have something that huge happen again to the company itself in the subsequent finale." Keith Phipps of The A.V. Club enjoyed the episode, noting that "however low-key its tone, I think "Tomorrowland" shakes up the status quo as profoundly as 'Shut The Door. Have A Seat.' Don's been heading in one direction—down—all season and now he's not. [..] Don seems to realize for the first time this week that he has his whole life ahead of him."

References

External links
 "Tomorrowland" at AMC
 

Mad Men (season 4) episodes
2010 American television episodes
Television episodes about Vietnam War